Peterborough Airport  is located  south-southwest of the city of Peterborough, Ontario, Canada. It includes a main  asphalt runway oriented east-west, and a smaller  paved (2014) runway oriented northwest-southeast. A new terminal building was built in 2011. Aircraft completions company Flying Colours Corp. is the largest tenant at the airport.

The airport is classified as an airport of entry by Nav Canada and is staffed by the Canada Border Services Agency (CBSA) on a call-out basis from the Oshawa Executive Airport. CBSA officers at this airport can handle general aviation aircraft only, with no more than 15 passengers.

Seneca College relocated its School of Aviation Technology to Peterborough Airport in January 2014, after their former airport Buttonville was scheduled to close. Seneca had 170 students in classes at its new facility in 2014. The $8.6 million contract was awarded to Mortlock Construction Inc. Mortlock significantly expanded an existing building that the city owned at the airport to about 46,000 square feet from 21,000 square feet, and completed the interior of the structure to the college's specifications with offices, rooms for flight simulators, classrooms, a student lounge, washrooms and a kitchen. Seneca's School of Aviation and Flight Technology has 19 aircraft at the airport.

Tenants

Current
 The Loomex Group, airport operators 
 Airtech Canada Aviation Services - aircraft engineering, manufacturing, and modification company; customer interior for medevac clients
 Flying Colours Corporation - aircraft care and design
 International Aircraft Support & Turbine Engine Sales - parts supplier for the Beechcraft King Air, 1900 Airliner and Pratt & Whitney Gas Turbine engines.
 Turbine Engine Sales - Pratt & Whitney parts supplier
 Kadex Aero Supply - surplus aircraft parts wholesaler
 President Air Charter - business charter
 Rapid Aircraft Repair Incorporated
 Gardens & Fields Restaurant - family dining 
 The Loomex Group- Airport operation and management, property management, emergency management training, emergency exercise design, public relations, communication and marketing
 Toronto Avionics - aircraft electronics and avionics repair
 Complete Aviation Services Limited FBO
 Vector Air Limited - executive class air charter service
 W.M. Aeroservice - general aviation maintenance, aircraft repair, private and commercial pilot training
 Seneca College, School of Aviation - provides the only aviation technology-based bachelor's degree in Canada 

Former
 Otonabee Airways (Air Atonabee Limited 1980), 1975–1984

Transportation

The airport is reached by car from Highway 115 via Airport Road. Parking is available on-site, although there are few spaces available.

References

External links
 Page about this airport on COPA's Places to Fly airport directory
 

Certified airports in Ontario
Airports in Ontario
Transport in Peterborough, Ontario
Buildings and structures in Peterborough, Ontario